HDG may refer to:

 Handan Airport, in Hebei Province, China
 Haus der Geschichte, a museum in Bonn, Germany
 Havre de Grace, Maryland, a city in the United States
 HDG International Group, an American energy company
 Horizontal Working Party on Drugs (formerly Horizontal Drug Group), a preparatory body of the Council of the European Union
 Hot dip galvanised steel, which consists of a cold reduced steel substrate onto which a layer of zinc is coated via a hot dip process to impart enhanced corrosion properties onto the base steel
 Heading (disambiguation)
 Heald Green railway station, in England
 Helicópteros de Guatemala, a Guatemalan helicopter operator
 Hunter Douglas, a Dutch window manufacturer